The  is a dam in Inawashiro, Fukushima Prefecture, Japan.

Dams in Fukushima Prefecture